The blue finch or yellow-billed blue finch (Porphyrospiza caerulescens) is a species of small bird. Although it was long classified in the bunting family Emberizidae, or the cardinal family Cardinalidae, more recent molecular studies have shown it fits comfortably in the Thraupini tribe within the family Thraupidae. 

It is found in Brazil and northeastern Bolivia, where its natural habitat is dry savanna. It is becoming rare due to habitat loss.

References

External links
"Blue finch"-"Porphyrospiza caerulescens" Photo gallery VIREO Photo-High Res--(Close-up)
Photo-High Res

blue finch
blue finch
Birds of the Cerrado
Birds of Brazil
blue finch
Taxonomy articles created by Polbot
Tanagers